Iridomyrmex dromus is a species of ant in the genus Iridomyrmex. Described by John S. Clark in 1938, the ant is a nocturnal species that is distributed nationwide in Australia, commonly found in habitats such as desert,  dry sclerophyll and rainforests in Tasmania.

References

Iridomyrmex
Hymenoptera of Australia
Insects described in 1938